The Church of Nuestra Señora de los Remedios (Spanish: Iglesia Parroquial de Nuestra Señora de los Remedios) is a church located in Estremera, Spain. It was declared Bien de Interés Cultural in 1982.

References 

Estremera
Churches in the Community of Madrid
Bien de Interés Cultural landmarks in the Community of Madrid